Government Medical College Thrissur (also known colloquially as Thrissur Medical College) is a government medical school situated in the city of Thrissur in the Indian state of Kerala.

Established in 1982, it is the fifth oldest medical college in the state and the fourth most popular choice for medical undergraduate students in the state.

It is affiliated to the Kerala University of Health Sciences which itself began functioning in the campus in 2009.

The college was selected as the best medical college in Kerala by the Swasthya conference 2021.

History
The college was inaugurated on 1 April 1982 by the Governor of Kerala, Jyothi Vencatachellum, who had also laid the foundation stone for the proposed college building at Mulagunnathukavu on 30 April 1982. Thrissur Medical College had its humble beginning at Mannuthy. By March 1983, the institution had moved to its permanent site at Mulamgunnathukavu, where the old buildings of the T.B. sanatorium were modified to accommodate the pre-clinical and the para-clinical departments as well as the administrative block.

The clinical departments started functioning on 22 October 1983 in the erstwhile District Hospital & Maternity Hospital buildings in Thrissur City. On 1 April 1985, the entire District Hospital was taken over. Construction of the 300 bedded Medical College Chest Hospital at Mulamgunnathukavu was completed in 1987. The primary health centre of Tholur was taken over by the college in 1986, for regular training of medical students in community and preventive care. Ollur and Erumappetty primary health centres were also made available for training purposes. Construction of the 400-bed new medical college hospital was started in 1995.

The first class of 74 students was admitted to the college in April 1982 who completed their course in the May 1987. The college was granted permanent recognition by IMC in 1991 and by WHO in 1993. In January 1995 construction of a new hospital complex was started in M.G Kavu. MD Radiodiagnosis courses were started in 1997 & MD general medicine courses were started in 2004.

In 2005 December the clinical departments were shifted from District Hospital to the New Medical College Hospital Complex in Mulagunnathukavu. The college celebrated its Silver Jubilee in the year 2007.

Principals

Constitution and working of the college
Government Medical College, Thrissur is under the Directorate of Medical Education, Government of Kerala.

The academic year extends from June to April/May. The college remains closed on Sundays, gazetted holidays and such other holidays as may be notified by the government.

Courses conducted

As of October 2009

Achievements

 Mammography with stereotactic biopsy – first sophisticated mammography system installed in India.
 H.P.L.C – First of its kind to be installed in Medical Colleges of Kerala.
 CT – Second spiral CT scanner installed in Kerala.
 I.I.T.V. (Image Intensifier Tele Vision fluoroscopy) system in CT block.
 New ventilator for Medical College Chest Hospital.
 V-Sat with medlar facility in the library – first unit installed in Medical Colleges of Kerala.

Non-academic

 Champions of 21st All Kerala Inter-Medicos youth festival held at Government Medical College, Thrissur in 2003.
 Second prize in 22nd All Kerala Inter-Medicos youth festival held at Government Medical College Calicut in 2004.
 Second prize in 23rd All Kerala Inter-Medicos youth festival held at Government Medical College Trivandrum in 2005
 Champions of 26th All Kerala Intermedicos Fest held at Pariyaram Medical College in March 2010
 First prize in State-level Inter-collegiate Youth Festival held as part of the silver jubilee celebrations of Government Medical College, Thrissur in November 2006
 Second prize in Arts in 22nd All Kerala Inter-Medicos Festival held at Government Medical College, Kottayam.
 1st prize for quiz in ULTIMATE 2008 held at T D Medical college, Allepey
2nd prize for quiz at MA college Kothamangalam & Adi Shankara College, Kalady
3rd prize for quiz at P S Varrier Ayurveda College, Kottakal

Campus

Medical College Establishments

 Medical College Administrative office, Pre-clinical & Para clinical departments including Mortuary & Office of Police Surgeon.
 New Medical College Hospital.
 Medical College Chest Hospital.
 Men's and women's hostel.
 Library.
 Canteens
 Post office and employees co-operative store.
 P.W.D (spl.buildings) section, S.B.T (Extn.counter)
 800 bedded extension of new Medical College Hospital complex.
 Teletherapy building.
 Museum block for forensic medicine.
 Lecture halls.
 TMCAA Sports complex

.
 Attached institutions outside the campus
 Health centre
 Rural: Tholur, Pambur & Erumappetty.
 Urban: Urban Community Health Centre, Kizhakkumbattukara. (in collaboration with Thrissur Corporation)

In addition there is an auditorium located deep inside the campus which hosts the Annual inter-batch youth festivals. There is a small temple in the campus. The three canteens in the campus are run by the Indian Coffee House. The non-clinical departments are situated as separate buildings inside the campus.

Alumni association

Thrissur Medical College Alumni Association (TMCAA)  is an organisation of the past and present students of Govt.Medical College, Thrissur and the teachers who served as faculty in this institution. As per the byelaw, this organisation is committed to the academic and infrastructural development of the alma mater. TMCAA conducts the famous CME programme for orientation for junior doctors for career advancement, helping doctors all over Kerala to get through the post-graduate MD/MS entrance examinations.

TMCAA have also provided teaching materials, audio visual equipment, furniture, computers, academic bulletin board, surgical instruments, instruments for pre-clinical medical training, high quality Histology teaching slides, medical journals and books, TVs, chairs, scanners and printers & LCD projectors to various departments.

TMCCA have also contributed in computerisation of MCCH out patient dept, beautification of the campus (by sponsoring planting of trees in MCCH), co sponsoring academic meetings and art festivals, co-sponsoring the 31st Inter-medical youth festival, felicitating our retiring teachers, hosting a web Site useful for the institution, supporting various academic activities of the students, reprographic services for PGs, departments administration, supporting water supply scheme of the college campus, supporting background work in IMC inspections, silver jubilee celebrations, working as a catalyst in various situations where administrative bottle necks affects the development of the alma mater and providing financial support for students.

The Thrissur Medical College Alumni Association built and donated an Academic Complex in the year 2009, at an approximate cost of Rs. 16 million. The complex consists of one Convocation Hall of 1000 seating capacity, three Seminar Halls of 200 seats, an Electronic Library and a two Food Courts. The entire complex is air conditioned, and now serves as the nerve center of academic activities. 
The TMCAA has also built and donated an Indoor Stadium cum Examination Hall at a cost of Rs. 55 million, after signing a Memorandum of Understanding with the Government of Kerala for this purpose.

See also
 List of medical colleges in India
 AIIMS
 JIPMER
 PGIMER Chandigarh
 CMC Vellore
 Azeezia Medical College
 Government T D Medical College, Alappuzha
 Government Medical College, Kozhikode
 Government Medical College, Thiruvananthapuram

Notes

External links

 Official website of Government medical College, Thrissur
 Thrissur Medical College Alumni Association(TMCAA) website
 More information and students comments about Medical College, Thrissur on iRADiX
 News on Medical college shifting, The Hindu, 5 June 2005
 Modernisation project of medical college in limbo, The Hindu, 24 February 2006

Colleges affiliated with the University of Calicut
Medical colleges in Thrissur
Thrissur
1982 establishments in Kerala
Educational institutions established in 1982